Deadman Island is an island near Suisun Bay. It is part of Solano County, California, and not managed by any reclamation district. It is labeled, along with Joice Island, Grizzly Island, Simmons Island, Ryer Island and Roe Island, on a 1902 USGS map of the area.

References

Islands of Solano County, California
Islands of the Sacramento–San Joaquin River Delta
Islands of Suisun Bay
Islands of Northern California